Corticotropin-releasing hormone receptor 2 (CRHR2) is a protein, also known by the IUPHAR-recommended name CRF2, that is encoded by the CRHR2 gene and occurs on the surfaces of some mammalian cells. CRF2 receptors are type 2 G protein-coupled receptors for corticotropin-releasing hormone (CRH) that are resident in the plasma membranes of hormone-sensitive cells. CRH, a peptide of 41 amino acids synthesized in the hypothalamus, is the principal neuroregulator of the hypothalamic-pituitary-adrenal axis, signaling via guanine nucleotide-binding proteins (G proteins) and downstream effectors such as adenylate cyclase. The CRF2 receptor is a multi-pass membrane protein with a transmembrane domain composed of seven helices arranged in a V-shape. CRF2 receptors are activated by two structurally similar peptides, urocortin II, and urocortin III, as well as CRH.

Properties

The human CRHR2 gene contains 12 exons. Three major functional isoforms, alpha (411 amino acids), beta (438 amino acids), and gamma (397 amino acids), encoded by transcripts with alternative first exons, differ only in the N-terminal sequence comprising the signal peptide and part of the extracellular domain (amino acids 18-108 of CRHR2 alpha); the unique N-terminal sequence of each isoform (34 amino acids in CRHR2 alpha; 61 amino acids in Hs CRHR2 beta; 20 amino acids in CRHR2 gamma) is followed by a sequence common to all isoforms (377 amino acids) comprising most of the multi-pass transmembrane domain followed by a cytoplasmic domain of 47 amino acids.

CRHR2 beta is expressed in human brain; CRHR2 alpha predominates in peripheral tissues. The N-terminal signal peptides of corticotropin-releasing hormone receptor 1 and CRHR2 beta are cleaved off in the endoplasmic reticulum to yield the mature receptors. In contrast, CRHR2 alpha contains a unique pseudo signal peptide that is not removed from the mature receptor. In adenylate cyclase activation assays, CRH-related peptides are 10 times more potent at stimulating CRHR2 beta than CRHR2 alpha and CRHR2 gamma, suggesting that the N-terminal sequence is involved in the ligand-receptor interaction.

See also
Corticotropin-releasing hormone receptor

References

Further reading

External links

 

G protein-coupled receptors
Corticotropin-releasing hormone